Robert Somerville Alexander (August 7, 1922 – April 7, 1993) was a Canadian professional baseball pitcher. He attended Bethany College in West Virginia. However, he did not make his Major League debut until 1955 with the Baltimore Orioles. He also played for the Cleveland Indians and the Toei Flyers of the Nippon Professional Baseball (NPB).

He is the first Canadian player in NPB history.

On top of playing baseball, he was also an Aviation Cadet in the United States Navy during World War II.

Professional career

New York Yankees
Before entering military service in 1944 Bob pitched for the Butler Yankees of the Class D Pennsylvania State Association and the Amsterdam Rugmakers in the Class C Canadian–American League. In  Bob  pitched for the Wellsville Yankees in the Class D Pony League and was 4–3 with a 3.60 ERA.

In  Bob split the season with Wellsville, the Hagerstown Owls of the Interstate League and the Norfolk Tars of the Piedmont League for a combined 6–9 record.

Bob threw a no-hitter on July 29,  against the Milwaukee Brewers.

Brooklyn Dodgers
In  Bob  was acquired by the Brooklyn Dodgers and pitched for the Montreal Royals in the International League, where Bob compiled a 15–9 record with a 3.58 ERA. Bob  didn't make the club in '52, instead he was back with Montreal for the regular season and was 8–7 with a 4.34 ERA.

Robert Alexander remained with Montreal in 1953 and after the season, Bob underwent surgery to remove bone chips from his elbow.

Portland Beavers
In  Bob was acquired by the Portland Beavers of the Pacific Coast League where Bob finished with a 10–12 record and 3.22 ERA. At the end of the season,  Robert Alexander, who was 32 years old at the time, was purchased by the Baltimore Orioles.

Baltimore Orioles
Robert Alexander made his Major League debut in a relief appearance for the Orioles on April 11,  against the Washington Senators. Bob  would make a further three relief outings before returning to Portland in July to record a 10–10 record and excellent 2.66 ERA.

Cleveland Indians
Robert Alexander made five relief appearances for the Indians to end his Major League career.

References

External links

Retrosheet

1922 births
1993 deaths
United States Navy personnel of World War II
Amsterdam Rugmakers players
Baltimore Orioles players
Baseball people from British Columbia
Beaumont Exporters players
Binghamton Triplets players
Bethany Bison baseball players
Butler Yankees players
Canadian expatriate baseball players in Japan
Canadian expatriate baseball players in the United States
Cleveland Indians players
Dallas Rangers players
Denver Bears players
Hagerstown Owls players
Licoreros de Pampero players
Louisville Colonels (minor league) players
Major League Baseball pitchers
Major League Baseball players from Canada
Montreal Royals players
Nippon Professional Baseball pitchers
Norfolk Tars players
Portland Beavers players
Sabios de Vargas players
Salem Senators players
San Diego Padres (minor league) players
Sportspeople from Vancouver
Toei Flyers players
Wellsville Yankees players